Ralph Atkin (born Jeffery Ralph Atkin in 1943) is the founder of SkyWest Airlines in the United States.

He founded SkyWest Airlines in 1972 and served first as CEO, then as Chairman of the Board for 20 years

A lifelong resident of St. George, Utah, Atkin served a mission for the Church of Jesus Christ of Latter-day Saints in England in his late teens and early 20s. He has undergraduate degrees from Dixie State College and Brigham Young University, an MBA from Golden Gate University and a doctorate of jurisprudence from the University of Utah.

In 1970 he was elected Washington County Attorney, a position he served in one term. From 1991 to 1993 he was director of economic development for the state of Utah. 

Atkin has also been associated with the attempted takeover of Trans World Airlines (TWA) in 2001 and with the startup of Ghana International Airlines in Ghana in 2004.

Atkin is a member of the Utah State Bar and has a private law practice in St. George.

He and his wife, Cheri Bennet Atkin, have eight children and 25 grandchildren. Professional skateboarder James R. Atkin is one of his sons.

Atkin is a member of the LDS Church. Among other positions in the church, he has served as a regional director of public affairs. He and his wife have also served as representatives for the church in Turkey.

References

External links 
 Ralph Atkin Biography
 SkyWest Airlines
 Ghana International Airlines

Living people
1943 births
American aviation businesspeople
Airline founders

20th-century American businesspeople
Utah Tech University alumni
Brigham Young University alumni
Golden Gate University alumni
University of Utah alumni
American Latter Day Saints
American Mormon missionaries in England
American expatriates in Turkey